Bakhtiozina Uldus Vildanovna is a Russian artist, film director, and photographer.

Early life and education
Uldus was born in Saint Petersburg, (former Leningrad of USSR), in a family with mixed religions and nationalities: a Muslim tatars father, a Christian half Ukrainian mother and a Jewish step-sister. Uldus considers herself as a "child of rebuilding time" Perestroika in Russia, with open minds and free from stereotypes.

She gained her first degree in politics in Russia at West-North Academy of public administration. She left Russia when she was 21 years old and started a new life in London. Her first professional work as a photographer was series of ironic self-portraits, while she was studying in London, at University of the Arts London, Central Saint Martins and London College of Communications

At the beginning of her career she directed videos for German musicians Popnoname – Anna, Change, and Russian singer Ilya Lagutenko Keta's project KETA – Clown.

Career
Despite the modern technology level, she prefers an analog camera instead of digital to catch the nature of an object, show its deepest edges and soul beneath them. For that purposes she uses medium format camera 6x7 and 120 film Kodak and old 35 mm film Leica R3 camera.

In 2014 Uldus became the first Russian speaker at a TED conference, giving a talk in Vancouver, British Columbia, Canada about her photo project Desperate Romantics.
She gave her second TED talk in 2017.

Uldus also spoke at Conference CDI conference in Mexico, as a finalist of Gifted Citizen Prize.

In October 2014 Uldus was named one of the strongest women of the year, according to the BBC, and took part in BBC debates and TV program 100 women, there her works were shown published at BBC channel. Uldus's photography was published in Vogue Italy, Aesthetica Magazine, C-41 Magazine, and many other international publishers. 
Bakhtiozina's works widely exhibited in Russia, England, Berlin, Hong-Kong, Singapore, and Milan.

One of her works is now in the collection of Ruya Foundation for Contemporary Culture in Iraq.

In April 2015 Uldus's artwork was selected and nominated in Leica + Vogue Italia with an exhibition in Milan.

Since 28 May 2014 Uldus's photographs have been exhibited in Anna Nova Gallery, Saint-Petersburg, Russia. Four of her works were included in Fabergé Museum in Saint Petersburg, Russia collection.

Also, Uldus was awarded as a winner in May 2015 in TOP-50 Noble People of Saint-Petersburg by Sobaka.ru as an artist. In 2021 Uldus was awarded as a film director.

Uldus is author and photographer of serial of photos for the movie "He is dragon" poster (original "Он-дракон".)

In the 2019/20 Season, Uldus made her debut at Royal Opera House  as a costume and make-up designer and style supervisor for Aisha and Abhaya, a co-production between The Royal Ballet and Rambert.

In 2020 she has completed her work as a film director, scriptwriter, costume designer and producer for her feature film debut Tzarevna Scaling (original "Дочь рыбака")

Film's premiere took place at Zerkalo International Film Festival under the name of Andrei Tarkovsky.

In 2021 Uldus's debut feature film Tzarevna Scaling (original "Дочь рыбака") was selected for Berlinale at Berlinale Forum section.

During 2021 the film Tzarevna Scaling took part at Shanghai International Film Festival,Riga International Film Festival, Raindance Film Festival and also New Horizons IFF (Poland), /slash film festival (Austria,)Luststreifen Basel Queer-Feminist FF (Switzerland), Olhar de Cinema Curitiba International Film Festival (Brazil), Festival Nouveau Cinéma (CA).

Exhibitions
 Best of Russia 2011, awarded in "Style" category, group exhibition, Vinzavod, Moscow
 Self universe, Gaze Gallery, Berlin, Germany, May 2013
 Desperate Romantics, Anna Nova Gallery, Saint-Petersburg, Russia, September 2013
 Mysterious Russian soul, part of Vogue Italia + Leica Exhibitions, announced in April 2015
 Russ Land Anna Nova Gallery, Saint-Petersburg, Russia, May–August 2015
 The Artist Knight, group exhibition, Kasteel van gaasbeek, Brussels, Belgium, July 2017
 Conjured life, Anna Nova Gallery, Saint-Petersburg, Russia, May–June 2017
 Circus 17, Anna Nova Gallery, Saint-Petersburg, Russia, November 2017
 The Artist Knight, group exhibition with Marina Abramović, Jan Fabre, Damien Hirst at Gaasbeek Castle, July 2017
 Film screening exhibition, Multimedia Art Museum, Moscow, November 2017
 Miss Future, the exhibition at Seen gallery, Brussels, Belgium August 2019
 Русская Сказка. От Васнецова До Сих Пор, the exhibition at Tretyakov Gallery, Moscow

 Raindance Review on Tzarevna Scaling https://raindance.org/festival-programme/tzarevna-scaling/
 Художник Мариинского Театра https://www.mariinsky.ru/company/costume_designers/bakhtiozina/
 InStyle Interview https://instyle.ru/lifestyle/culture/intervyu-yuldus-bakhtiozinoy/
 Царевны International: «Дочъ Рыбака» — Кокошный Филъм О Постсоветской Женственности https://kinoart.ru/reviews/tsarevny-international-doch-rybaka-kokoshnyy-film-o-postsovetskoy-zhenstvennosti
 Юлдус Бахтиозина стала художницей по костюмам трех сочинений Стравинского в Мариинском театре https://topspb.tv/news/2021/08/9/hudozhnik-po-kostyumam-mariinskogo-teatra-debyutirovala-kak-rezhisser-kino/
 Calvert Journal https://www.calvertjournal.com/features/show/12657/tzarevna-scaling-uldus-bakhtiozina-berlinale-2020-russian-folk-film-coming-of-age

References

External links
 Uldus official site
 Costume Designer in Russia, Mariinsky Theatre
 Costume Designer in Europe, Royal Opera House
 
 Uldus TED conference talk "Wry photos that turn stereotypes upside down"
 Artist at Anna Nova Gallery

1986 births
Living people
Russian artists
Russian women artists
Russian women photographers
Russian photographers
BBC 100 Women